This is a complete list of Scottish Statutory Instruments in 2002.

1-100

 BSE Monitoring (Scotland) Amendment Regulations 2002 (S.S.I. 2002/1)
 Environmental Impact Assessment (Uncultivated Land and Semi-Natural Areas) (Scotland) Regulations 2002 (S.S.I. 2002/6)
 Act of Sederunt (Amendment of Ordinary Cause Rules and Summary Applications, Statutory Applications and Appeals etc. Rules) (Applications under the Mortgage Rights (Scotland) Act 2001) 2002 (S.S.I. 2002/7)
 Food Protection (Emergency Prohibitions) (Amnesic Shellfish Poisoning) (West Coast) (No. 9) (Scotland) Revocation Order 2002 (S.S.I. 2002/9)
 River Dee (Kirkcudbright) Salmon Fishery District (Baits and Lures) Regulations 2002 (S.S.I. 2002/11)
 Children (Scotland) Act 1995 (Commencement No. 5) Order 2002 (S.S.I. 2002/12)
 Road Works (Inspection Fees) (Scotland) Amendment Regulations 2002 (S.S.I. 2002/13)
 Motor Vehicles (Competitions and Trials) (Scotland) Amendment Regulations 2002 (S.S.I. 2002/14)
 Local Authorities Etc. (Allowances) (Scotland) Amendment Regulations 2002 (S.S.I. 2002/15)
 National Health Service (Optical Charges and Payments) (Scotland) Amendment Regulations 2002 (S.S.I. 2002/17)
 Scottish Commission for the Regulation of Care (Consultation on Transfer of Staff) Order 2002 (S.S.I. 2002/18)
 Food Protection (Emergency Prohibitions) (Amnesic Shellfish Poisoning) (West Coast) (No. 4) (Scotland) Partial Revocation (No. 2) Order 2002 (S.S.I. 2002/19)
 Food Protection (Emergency Prohibitions) (Amnesic Shellfish Poisoning) (West Coast) (No. 7) (Scotland) Revocation Order 2002 (S.S.I. 2002/20)
 Import and Export Restrictions (Foot-and-Mouth Disease) (Scotland) (No. 3) Amendment Regulations 2002 (S.S.I. 2002/21)
 Cattle Identification (Notification of Movement) (Scotland) Amendment Regulations 2002 (S.S.I. 2002/22)
 Police Act 1997 (Criminal Records) (Registration) (Scotland) Regulations 2002 (S.S.I. 2002/23)
 Children's Hearings (Legal Representation) (Scotland) Amendment Rules 2002 (S.S.I. 2002/30)
 Local Authorities' Traffic Orders (Procedure) (Scotland) Amendment Regulations 2002 (S.S.I. 2002/31)
 Scottish Legal Services Ombudsman (Compensation) (Prescribed Amount) Order 2002 (S.S.I. 2002/32)
 Water Services Charges (Billing and Collection) (Scotland) Order 2002 (S.S.I. 2002/33)
 Disease Control (Interim Measures) (Scotland) Order 2002 (S.S.I. 2002/34)
 Import and Export Restrictions (Foot-and-Mouth Disease) (Scotland) (No. 3) Amendment (No. 2) Regulations 2002 (S.S.I. 2002/35)
 Food and Animal Feedingstuffs (Products of Animal Origin from China) (Control) (Scotland) Regulations 2002 (S.S.I. 2002/36)
 Advice and Assistance (Assistance by Way of Representation) (Scotland) Amendment Regulations 2002 (S.S.I. 2002/37)
 Sheep and Goats Movement (Interim Measures) (Scotland) Order 2002 (S.S.I. 2002/38)
 Sheep and Goats Identification (Scotland) Amendment Regulations 2002 (S.S.I. 2002/39)
 Building Standards (Scotland) Amendment Regulations 2001 Amendment Regulations 2002 (S.S.I. 2002/40)
 Pig Industry Restructuring (Capital Grant) (Scotland) Scheme 2002 (S.S.I. 2002/43)
 Pig Industry Restructuring (Non-Capital Grant) (Scotland) Scheme 2002 (S.S.I. 2002/44)
 Housing Revenue Account General Fund Contribution Limits (Scotland) Order 2002 (S.S.I. 2002/45)
 Damages (Personal Injury) (Scotland) Order 2002 (S.S.I. 2002/46)
 Domestic Water and Sewerage Charges (Reduction) (Scotland) Regulations 2002 (S.S.I. 2002/47)
 Food Protection (Emergency Prohibitions) (Amnesic Shellfish Poisoning) (West Coast) (No. 14) (Scotland) Revocation Order 2002 (S.S.I. 2002/48)
 Food Protection (Emergency Prohibitions) (Amnesic Shellfish Poisoning) (West Coast) (Scotland) Order 2002 (S.S.I. 2002/49)
 Notification of Marketing of Food for Particular Nutritional Uses (Scotland) Regulations 2002 (S.S.I. 2002/50)
 Sea Fishing (Enforcement of Community Quota and Third Country Fishing Measures) (Scotland) Order 2002 (S.S.I. 2002/51)
 Foot-and-Mouth Disease Declaratory (Controlled Area) (Scotland) Amendment and Revocation Order 2002 (S.S.I. 2002/54)
 Ethical Standards in Public Life etc. (Scotland) Act 2000 (Stipulated Time Limit) Order 2002 (S.S.I. 2002/55)
 Road Traffic (NHS Charges) Amendment (Scotland) Regulations 2002 (S.S.I. 2002/56)
 Food Protection (Emergency Prohibitions) (Diarrhetic Shellfish Poisoning) (Orkney) (Scotland) Revocation Order 2002 (S.S.I. 2002/57)
 Sea Fish (Prohibited Methods of Fishing) (Firth of Clyde) Order 2002 (S.S.I. 2002/58)
 Nurses, Midwives and Health Visitors (Professional Conduct) (Amendment) Rules 2002 Approval (Scotland) Order 2002 (S.S.I. 2002/59)
 Scottish Social Services Council (Appointments, Procedure and Access to the Register) Amendment Regulations 2002 (S.S.I. 2002/60)
 Sweeteners in Food Amendment (Scotland) Regulations 2002 (S.S.I. 2002/61)
 Race Relations Act 1976 (Statutory Duties) (Scotland) Order 2002 (S.S.I. 2002/62)
 Children's Hearings (Legal Representation) (Scotland) Rules 2002 (S.S.I. 2002/63)
 Food (Star Anise from Third Countries) (Emergency Control) (Scotland) Order 2002 (S.S.I. 2002/64)
 Food Protection (Emergency Prohibitions) (Amnesic Shellfish Poisoning) (West Coast) (No. 2) (Scotland) Order 2002 (S.S.I. 2002/65)
 Food Protection (Emergency Prohibitions) (Amnesic Shellfish Poisoning) (West Coast) (No. 12) (Scotland) Partial Revocation Order 2002 (S.S.I. 2002/66)
 Food Protection (Emergency Prohibitions) (Amnesic Shellfish Poisoning) (West Coast) (No. 2) (Scotland) Partial Revocation Order 2002 (S.S.I. 2002/67)
 Mobility and Access Committee for Scotland Regulations 2002 (S.S.I. 2002/69)
 Local Government Finance (Scotland) Order 2002 (S.S.I. 2002/70)
 Standards in Scotland's Schools etc. Act 2000 (Commencement No. 5) Order 2002 (S.S.I. 2002/72)
 School Education (Amendment) (Scotland) Act 2002 (Commencement) Order 2002 (S.S.I. 2002/74)
 Health and Social Care Act 2001 (Commencement No. 9) (Scotland) Order 2002 (S.S.I. 2002/75)
 Preserved Rights (Transfer to Responsible Authorities) (Scotland) Regulations 2002 (S.S.I. 2002/76)
 Public Finance and Accountability (Scotland) Act 2000 (Economy, efficiency and effectiveness examinations) (Specified bodies etc.) Order 2002 (S.S.I. 2002/77)
 Public Finance and Accountability (Scotland) Act 2000 (Access to Documents and Information) (Relevant Persons) Order 2002 (S.S.I. 2002/78)
 Food Protection (Emergency Prohibitions) (Amnesic Shellfish Poisoning) (West Coast) (No. 3) (Scotland) Order 2002 (S.S.I. 2002/80)
 Sea Fishing (Enforcement of Community Conservation Measures) (Scotland) Amendment Order 2002 (S.S.I. 2002/81)
 Food Protection (Emergency Prohibitions) (Paralytic Shellfish Poisoning) (Orkney) (No. 3) (Scotland) Revocation Order 2002 (S.S.I. 2002/82)
 Financial Assistance for Environmental Purposes (Scotland) Order 2002 (S.S.I. 2002/83)
 Police and Fire Services (Finance) (Scotland) Act 2001 (Commencement) Order 2002 (S.S.I. 2002/84)
 National Assistance (Sums for Personal Requirements) (Scotland) Regulations 2002 (S.S.I. 2002/85)
 National Health Service (Optical Charges and Payments) and (General Ophthalmic Services) (Scotland) Amendment Regulations 2002 (S.S.I. 2002/86)
 Poultry Meat, Farmed Game Bird Meat and Rabbit Meat (Hygiene and Inspection) Amendment (Scotland) Regulations 2002 (S.S.I. 2002/87)
 Civil Legal Aid (Scotland) Amendment Regulations 2002 (S.S.I. 2002/88)
 Non-Domestic Rate (Scotland) Order 2002 (S.S.I. 2002/89)
 Provision of School Education for Children under School Age (Prescribed Children) (Scotland) Order 2002 (S.S.I. 2002/90)
 Non-Domestic Rates (Levying) (Scotland) Regulations 2002 (S.S.I. 2002/91)
 Electricity from Non-Fossil Fuel Sources (Locational Flexibility) (Scotland) Order 2002 (S.S.I. 2002/92)
 Electricity from Non-Fossil Fuel Sources (Scotland) Saving Arrangements (Modification) Order 2002 (S.S.I. 2002/93)
 Fossil Fuel Levy (Scotland) Amendment Regulations 2002 (S.S.I. 2002/94)
 Adults with Incapacity (Supervision of Welfare Guardians etc. by Local Authorities) (Scotland) Regulations 2002 (S.S.I. 2002/95)
 Adults with Incapacity (Reports in Relation to Guardianship and Intervention Orders) (Scotland) Regulations 2002 (S.S.I. 2002/96)
 Adults with Incapacity (Recall of Guardians' Powers) (Scotland) Regulations 2002 (S.S.I. 2002/97)
 Adults with Incapacity (Non-compliance with Decisions of Welfare Guardians) (Scotland) Regulations 2002 (S.S.I. 2002/98)
 The National Health Service (General Dental Services and Dental Charges) (Scotland) Amendment Regulations 2002 (S.S.I. 2002/99)
 The National Health Service (Charges for Drugs and Appliances) (Scotland) Amendment Regulations 2002 (S.S.I. 2002/100)

101-200

 Council Tax (Exempt Dwellings) (Scotland) Amendment Order 2002 (S.S.I. 2002/101)
 Council Tax (Dwellings and Part Residential Subjects) (Scotland) Amendment Regulations 2002 (S.S.I. 2002/102)
 NHS Education for Scotland Order 2002 (S.S.I. 2002/103)
 Control of Noise (Codes of Practice for Construction and Open Sites) (Scotland) Order 2002 (S.S.I. 2002/104)
 Scottish Council for Postgraduate Medical and Dental Education and NHS Education for Scotland (Transfer of Staff) Regulations 2002 (S.S.I. 2002/105)
 Scottish Commission for the Regulation of Care (Appointments and Procedure) Regulations 2002 (S.S.I. 2002/106)
 Prisons and Young Offenders Institutions (Scotland) Amendment Rules 2002 (S.S.I. 2002/107)
 Scottish Commission for the Regulation of Care (Staff Transfer Scheme) Order 2002 (S.S.I. 2002/108)
 Import and Export Restrictions (Foot-and-Mouth Disease) (Scotland) (No. 3) Revocation Regulations 2002 (S.S.I. 2002/109)
 Dairy Produce Quotas (Scotland) Regulations 2002 (S.S.I. 2002/110)
 National Health Service (General Medical Services and Pharmaceutical Services) (Scotland) Amendment Regulations 2002 (S.S.I. 2002/111)
 Regulation of Care (Fees) (Scotland) Order 2002 (S.S.I. 2002/112)
 Regulation of Care (Applications and Provision of Advice) (Scotland) Order 2002 (S.S.I. 2002/113)
 Regulation of Care (Requirements as to Care Services) (Scotland) Regulations 2002 (S.S.I. 2002/114)
 Regulation of Care (Registration and Registers) (Scotland) Regulations 2002 (S.S.I. 2002/115)
 Police Grant (Scotland) Order 2002 (S.S.I. 2002/116)
 Plant Protection Products Amendment (Scotland) Regulations 2002 (S.S.I. 2002/117)
 Water Industry (Scotland) Act 2002 (Commencement and Savings) Order 2002 (S.S.I. 2002/118)
 Restriction of Liberty Order (Scotland) Amendment Regulations 2002 (S.S.I. 2002/119)
 Regulation of Care (Excepted Services) (Scotland) Regulations 2002 (S.S.I. 2002/120)
 Clydeport (Closure of Yorkhill Basin) Harbour Revision Order 2002 (S.S.I. 2002/121)
 Town and Country Planning (Fees for Applications and Deemed Applications) (Scotland) Amendment Regulations 2002 (S.S.I. 2002/122)
 Police Act 1997 (Commencement No. 10) (Scotland) Order 2002 (S.S.I. 2002/124)
 Animals and Animal Products (Import and Export) (Scotland) Amendment Regulations 2002 (S.S.I. 2002/125)
 Food Protection (Emergency Prohibitions) (Amnesic Shellfish Poisoning) (West Coast) (No. 5) (Scotland) Revocation Order 2002 (S.S.I. 2002/126)
 Food Protection (Emergency Prohibitions) (Amnesic Shellfish Poisoning) (West Coast) (No. 8) (Scotland) Revocation Order 2002 (S.S.I. 2002/127)
 Act of Sederunt (Ordinary Cause Rules) Amendment (Applications under the Protection from Abuse (Scotland) Act 2001) 2002 (S.S.I. 2002/128)
 Act of Sederunt (Summary Applications, Statutory Applications and Appeals etc. Rules) Amendment (Detention and Forfeiture of Terrorist Cash) 2002 (S.S.I. 2002/129)
 Act of Sederunt (Summary Applications, Statutory Applications and Appeals etc. Rules) Amendment (No. 2) (Local Government (Scotland) Act 1973) 2002 (S.S.I. 2002/130)
 Adults with Incapacity (Public Guardian's Fees) (Scotland) Amendment Regulations 2002 (S.S.I. 2002/131)
 Act of Sederunt (Summary Cause Rules) 2002 (S.S.I. 2002/132)
 Act of Sederunt (Small Claims Rules) 2002 (S.S.I. 2002/133)
 Budget (Scotland) Act 2001 (Amendment) Order 2002 (S.S.I. 2002/134)
 Act of Adjournal (Criminal Procedure Rules Amendment No.2) (Anti-Terrorism, Crime and Security Act 2001) 2002 (S.S.I. 2002/136)
 Act of Adjournal (Criminal Procedure Rules Amendment) (Convention Rights (Compliance) (Scotland) Act 2001) 2002 (S.S.I. 2002/137)
 Mull Salmon Fishery District Designation (Scotland) Order 2002 (S.S.I. 2002/138)
 Less Favoured Area Support Scheme (Scotland) Regulations 2002 (S.S.I. 2002/139)
 Combined Police Area Amalgamation Schemes 1995 (Amendment) (Scotland) Order 2002 (S.S.I. 2002/140)
 Combined Fire Services Area Administration Schemes (Variation) (Scotland) Order 2002 (S.S.I. 2002/141)
 Nurses, Midwives and Health Visitors (Professional Conduct) (Amendment) (No. 2) Rules 2002 Approval (Scotland) Order 2002 (S.S.I. 2002/142)
 Police Act 1997 (Criminal Records) (Scotland) Regulations 2002 (S.S.I. 2002/143)
 Advice and Assistance (Financial Conditions) (Scotland) Regulations 2002 (S.S.I. 2002/144)
 Civil Legal Aid (Financial Conditions) (Scotland) Regulations 2002 (S.S.I. 2002/145)
 Act of Sederunt (Summary Applications, Statutory Applications and Appeals etc. Rules) Amendment (No. 3) (Adults with Incapacity) 2002 (S.S.I. 2002/146)
 Producer Responsibility Obligations (Packaging Waste) Amendment (Scotland) Regulations 2002 (S.S.I. 2002/147)
 Food (Figs, Hazelnuts and Pistachios from Turkey) (Emergency Control) (Scotland) Regulations 2002 (S.S.I. 2002/148)
 Food (Peanuts from China) (Emergency Control) (Scotland) Regulations 2002 (S.S.I. 2002/149)
 Food Protection (Emergency Prohibitions) (Amnesic Shellfish Poisoning) (West Coast) (Scotland) Revocation Order 2002 (S.S.I. 2002/152)
 National Health Service (General Medical Services and Pharmaceutical Services) (Scotland) Amendment (No. 2) Regulations 2002 (S.S.I. 2002/153)
 Aberdeen City Council and Aberdeenshire Council Boundaries (Blackburn) Amendment Order 2002 (S.S.I. 2002/154)
 Argyll and Bute Council and West Dunbartonshire Council Boundaries (Ardoch Sewage Works) Amendment Order 2002 (S.S.I. 2002/155)
 Glasgow City Council and Renfrewshire Council Boundaries (Braehead) Amendment Order 2002 (S.S.I. 2002/156)
 City of Edinburgh Council and West Lothian Council Boundaries (West Farm, Broxburn) Amendment Order 2002 (S.S.I. 2002/157)
 Electricity Lands and Generators (Rateable Values) (Scotland) Variation Order 2002 (S.S.I. 2002/158)
 Water Undertakings (Rateable Values) (Scotland) Variation Order 2002 (S.S.I. 2002/159)
 Food Protection (Emergency Prohibitions) (Amnesic Shellfish Poisoning) (West Coast) (No. 4) (Scotland) Revocation Order 2002 (S.S.I. 2002/160)
 Civic Government (Scotland) Act 1982 (Licensing of Houses in Multiple Occupation) Amendment Order 2002 (S.S.I. 2002/161)
 Regulation of Care (Scotland) Act 2001 (Commencement No. 2 and Transitional Provisions) Order 2002 (S.S.I. 2002/162)
 Renewables Obligation (Scotland) Order 2002 (S.S.I. 2002/163)
 Plant Health (Great Britain) Amendment (Scotland) Order 2002 (S.S.I. 2002/164)
 Scottish Water (Rate of Return) (Scotland) Order 2002 (S.S.I. 2002/165)
 Water Industry (Scotland) Act 2002 (Consequential and Savings Provisions) Order 2002 (S.S.I. 2002/166)
 Water and Sewerage Charges (Exemption) (Scotland) Regulations 2002 (S.S.I. 2002/167)
 Housing (Scotland) Act 2001 (Commencement No. 4, Transitional Provisions and Savings) Order 2002 (S.S.I. 2002/168)
 Import and Export Restrictions (Foot-and-Mouth Disease) (Scotland) (No. 3) Amendment (No. 2) Amendment Regulations 2002 (S.S.I. 2002/169)
 Community Care and Health (Scotland) Act 2002 (Commencement No. 1) Order 2002 (S.S.I. 2002/170)
 Housing Support Grant (Scotland) Order 2002 (S.S.I. 2002/171)
 Adults with Incapacity (Scotland) Act 2000 (Commencement No. 1) (Amendment) Order 2002 (S.S.I. 2002/172)
 Public Finance and Accountability (Scotland) Act 2000 (Consequential Modifications) Order 2002 (S.S.I. 2002/176)
 Home Zones (Scotland) Regulations 2002 (S.S.I. 2002/177)
 Forth Estuary Transport Authority Order 2002 (S.S.I. 2002/178)
 Food (Jelly Confectionery) (Emergency Control) (Scotland) Regulations 2002 (S.S.I. 2002/179)
 Protection of Wild Mammals (Scotland) Act 2002 (Commencement) Order 2002 (S.S.I. 2002/181)
 Food Protection (Emergency Prohibitions) (Amnesic Shellfish Poisoning) (West Coast) (No. 2) (Scotland) Order 2001 Revocation Order 2002 (S.S.I. 2002/182)
 Food Protection (Emergency Prohibitions) (Amnesic Shellfish Poisoning) (West Coast) (No. 2) (Scotland) Revocation Order 2002 (S.S.I. 2002/183)
 Marriage (Scotland) Act 2002 (Commencement) Order 2002 (S.S.I. 2002/184)
 Loch Ewe, Isle of Ewe, Wester Ross, Scallops Several Fishery (Variation) Order 2002 (S.S.I. 2002/185)
 Little Loch Broom Scallops Several Fishery Order 2002 (S.S.I. 2002/186)
 Road Traffic (Permitted Parking Area and Special Parking Area) (City of Glasgow) Designation Amendment Order 2002 (S.S.I. 2002/187)
 Road Traffic (Permitted Parking Area and Special Parking Area) (City of Edinburgh) Designation Amendment Order 2002 (S.S.I. 2002/188)
 Adults with Incapacity (Scotland) Act 2000 (Commencement No. 2) Order 2002 (S.S.I. 2002/189)
 Adults with Incapacity (Ethics Committee) (Scotland) Regulations 2002 (S.S.I. 2002/190)
 Artificial Insemination of Cattle (Animal Health) (Scotland) Amendment Regulations 2002 (S.S.I. 2002/191)
 National Health Service (General Dental Services) (Scotland) Amendment Regulations 2002 (S.S.I. 2002/192)
 Registration of Fish Farming and Shellfish Farming Businesses Amendment (Scotland) Order 2002 (S.S.I. 2002/193)
 Animals and Animal Products (Import and Export) (Scotland) Amendment (No. 2) Regulations 2002 (S.S.I. 2002/196)
 Food Protection (Emergency Prohibitions) (Amnesic, Paralytic and Diarrhetic shellfish poisoning) (Orkney) (Scotland) Revocation Order 2002 (S.S.I. 2002/197)
 Food Protection (Emergency Prohibitions) (Amnesic Shellfish Poisoning) (West Coast) (No. 12) (Scotland) Revocation Order 2002 (S.S.I. 2002/198)
 Bus User Complaints Tribunal Regulations 2002 (S.S.I. 2002/199)

201-300

 Loch Lomond and The Trossachs National Park Designation, Transitional and Consequential Provisions (Scotland) Order 2002 (S.S.I. 2002/201)
 Loch Lomond and The Trossachs National Park Elections (Scotland) Order 2002 (S.S.I. 2002/202)
 Regulation of Investigatory Powers (Source Records) (Scotland) Regulations 2002 (S.S.I. 2002/205)
 Regulation of Investigatory Powers (Juveniles) (Scotland) Order 2002 (S.S.I. 2002/206)
 Regulation of Investigatory Powers (Cancellation of Authorisations) (Scotland) Regulations 2002 (S.S.I. 2002/207)
 Adults with Incapacity (Medical Treatment Certificates) (Scotland) Regulations 2002 (S.S.I. 2002/208)
 Police Act 1997 (Enhanced Criminal Record Certificates) (Protection of Vulnerable Adults) (Scotland) Regulations 2002 (S.S.I. 2002/217)
 Food Protection (Emergency Prohibitions) (Amnesic Shellfish Poisoning) (West Coast) (No. 3) (Scotland) Revocation Order 2002 (S.S.I. 2002/218)
 Registration of Fish Farming and Shellfish Farming Businesses Amendment (No. 2) (Scotland) Order 2002 (S.S.I. 2002/220)
 Disease Control and Animal Movements (Interim Measures) (Scotland) Amendment Order 2002 (S.S.I. 2002/221)
 Plant Health (Phytophthora ramorum) (Scotland) Order 2002 (S.S.I. 2002/223)
 National Health Service (Optical Charges and Payments) (Scotland) Amendment (No. 2) Regulations 2002 (S.S.I. 2002/224)
 Dairy Produce Quotas (Scotland) Amendment Regulations 2002 (S.S.I. 2002/228)
 Local Government Finance (Scotland) (No. 2) Order 2002 (S.S.I. 2002/230)
 Food Protection (Emergency Prohibitions) (Amnesic Shellfish Poisoning) (West Coast) (No. 4) (Scotland) Order 2002 (S.S.I. 2002/231)
 Community Care and Health (Scotland) Act 2002 (Consequential Amendment) Order 2002 (S.S.I. 2002/233)
 Meat (Hazard Analysis and Critical Control Point) (Scotland) Regulations 2002 (S.S.I. 2002/234)
 Act of Sederunt (Fees of Solicitors in the Sheriff Court) (Amendment) 2002 (S.S.I. 2002/235)
 Welfare of Animals (Slaughter or Killing) Amendment (Scotland) Regulations 2002 (S.S.I. 2002/238)
 National Health Service (Clinical Negligence and Other Risks Indemnity Scheme) (Scotland) Amendment Regulations 2002 (S.S.I. 2002/239)
 Criminal Legal Aid (Scotland) (Fees) Amendment Regulations 2002 (S.S.I. 2002/246)
 Criminal Legal Aid (Fixed Payments) (Scotland) Amendment Regulations 2002 (S.S.I. 2002/247)
 St Mary's Music School (Aided Places) (Scotland) Amendment Regulations 2002 (S.S.I. 2002/248)
 Education (Assisted Places) (Scotland) Amendment Regulations 2002 (S.S.I. 2002/249)
 Civil Legal Aid (Scotland) Amendment (No. 2) Regulations 2002 (S.S.I. 2002/254)
 TSE (Scotland) Regulations 2002 (S.S.I. 2002/255)
 Marriage (Approval of Places) (Scotland) Regulations 2002 (S.S.I. 2002/260)
 Valuation and Rating (Exempted Classes) (Scotland) Order 2002 (S.S.I. 2002/262)
 Scottish Transport Group (Dissolution) Order 2002 (S.S.I. 2002/263)
 Community Care (Disregard of Resources) (Scotland) Order 2002 (S.S.I. 2002/264)
 Community Care (Additional Payments) (Scotland) Regulations 2002 (S.S.I. 2002/265)
 Community Care (Deferred Payment of Accommodation Costs) (Scotland) Regulations 2002 (S.S.I. 2002/266)
 Contaminants in Food (Scotland) Regulations 2002 (S.S.I. 2002/267)
 National Health Service (General Dental Services) (Scotland) Amendment (No. 2) Regulations 2002 (S.S.I. 2002/268)
 Sheriff Court Fees Amendment Order 2002 (S.S.I. 2002/269)
 Court of Session etc. Fees Amendment Order 2002 (S.S.I. 2002/270)
 Pesticides (Maximum Residue Levels in Crops, Food and Feeding Stuffs) (Scotland) Amendment Regulations 2002 (S.S.I. 2002/271)
 Loch Caolisport Scallops Several Fishery (Scotland) Order 2002 (S.S.I. 2002/272)
 Act of Sederunt (Fees of Solicitors in the Sheriff Court) (Amendment No. 2) 2002 (S.S.I. 2002/274)
 Adults with Incapacity (Specified Medical Treatments) (Scotland) Regulations 2002 (S.S.I. 2002/275)
 Designation of Nitrate Vulnerable Zones (Scotland) Regulations 2002 (S.S.I. 2002/276)
 New Water and Sewerage Authorities Dissolution (Scotland) Order 2002 (S.S.I. 2002/277)
 Extensification Payment (Scotland) Regulations 2002 (S.S.I. 2002/278)
 Plant Protection Products Amendment (No. 2) (Scotland) Regulations 2002 (S.S.I. 2002/279)
 Act of Sederunt (Fees of Witnesses and Shorthand Writers in the Sheriff Court) (Amendment) 2002 (S.S.I. 2002/280)
 Gaming Act (Variation of Fees) (Scotland) Order 2002 (S.S.I. 2002/281)
 Education (Student Loans) Amendment (Scotland) Regulations 2002 (S.S.I. 2002/282)
 Animal By-Products (Identification) Amendment (Scotland) Regulations 2002 (S.S.I. 2002/283)
 Food (Control of Irradiation) Amendment (Scotland) Regulations 2002 (S.S.I. 2002/284)
 Feeding Stuffs Amendment (Scotland) Regulations 2002 (S.S.I. 2002/285)
 Teachers' Superannuation (Scotland) Amendment Regulations 2002 (S.S.I. 2002/288)
 Bus Service Operators Grant (Scotland) Regulations 2002 (S.S.I. 2002/289)
 Travel Concessions (Eligible Services) (Scotland) Order 2002 (S.S.I. 2002/290)
 Transport (Scotland) Act 2001 (Commencement No. 3 and Transitional Provisions) Order 2002 (S.S.I. 2002/291)
 Home Zones (Scotland) (No. 2) Regulations 2002 (S.S.I. 2002/292)
 Advisory Council (Establishment) (Scotland) Regulations 2002 (S.S.I. 2002/293)
 Peterhead Bay Authority (Constitution) Revision Order 2002 (S.S.I. 2002/294)
 Air Quality (Scotland) Amendment Regulations 2002 (S.S.I. 2002/297)
 Food and Animal Feedingstuffs (Products of Animal Origin from China) (Emergency Control) (Scotland) Regulations 2002 (S.S.I. 2002/300)

301-400

 Act of Sederunt (Rules of the Court of Session Amendment) (Fees of Solicitors, Shorthand Writers and Witnesses) 2002 (S.S.I. 2002/301)
 Adults with Incapacity (Specified Medical Treatments) (Scotland) Amendment Regulations 2002 (S.S.I. 2002/302)
 The Community Care (Personal Care and Nursing Care) (Scotland) Regulations 2002 (S.S.I. 2002/303)
 Community Care (Assessment of Needs) (Scotland) Regulations 2002 (S.S.I. 2002/304)
 National Waiting Times Centre Board (Scotland) Order 2002 (S.S.I. 2002/305)
 Food Protection (Emergency Prohibitions) (Amnesic Shellfish Poisoning) (West Coast) (No. 5) (Scotland) Order 2002 (S.S.I. 2002/306)
 Food Protection (Emergency Prohibitions) (Amnesic Shellfish Poisoning) (West Coast) (No. 6) (Scotland) Order 2002 (S.S.I. 2002/307)
 Aberdeen Harbour Revision (Constitution) Order 2002 (S.S.I. 2002/310)
 Local Government Pension Scheme (Scotland) Amendment Regulations 2002 (S.S.I. 2002/311)
 Scottish Secure Tenants (Compensation for Improvements) Regulations 2002 (S.S.I. 2002/312)
 Scottish Secure Tenancies (Abandoned Property) Order 2002 (S.S.I. 2002/313)
 Scottish Secure Tenancies (Exceptions) Regulations 2002 (S.S.I. 2002/314)
 Short Scottish Secure Tenancies (Notices) Regulations 2002 (S.S.I. 2002/315)
 Scottish Secure Tenants (Right to Repair) Regulations 2002 (S.S.I. 2002/316)
 Housing (Right to Buy) (Houses Liable to Demolition) (Scotland) Order 2002 (S.S.I. 2002/317)
 Housing (Scotland) Act 2001 (Scottish Secure Tenancy etc.) Order 2002 (S.S.I. 2002/318)
 Short Scottish Secure Tenancies (Proceedings for Possession) Regulations 2002 (S.S.I. 2002/319)
 Scottish Secure Tenancies (Proceedings for Possession) Regulations 2002 (S.S.I. 2002/320)
 Housing (Scotland) Act 2001 (Commencement No. 5, Transitional Provisions and Savings) Order 2002 (S.S.I. 2002/321)
 Right to Purchase (Application Form) (Scotland) Order 2002 (S.S.I. 2002/322)
 Criminal Justice Act 1988 (Offensive Weapons) Amendment (Scotland) Order 2002 (S.S.I. 2002/323)
 Environmental Impact Assessment (Scotland) Amendment Regulations 2002 (S.S.I. 2002/324)
 The Common Agricultural Policy (Wine) (Scotland) Regulations 2002 (S.S.I. 2002/325)
 Act of Sederunt (Fees of Solicitors in the Sheriff Court) (Amendment No. 3) 2002 (S.S.I. 2002/328)
 Advice and Assistance (Financial Conditions) (Scotland) (No. 2) Regulations 2002 (S.S.I. 2002/329)
 Civil Legal Aid (Financial Conditions) (Scotland) (No. 2) Regulations 2002 (S.S.I. 2002/330)
 Food Protection (Emergency Prohibitions) (Amnesic Shellfish Poisoning) (West Coast) (No. 7) (Scotland) Order 2002 (S.S.I. 2002/332)
 Food Protection (Emergency Prohibitions) (Amnesic Shellfish Poisoning) (West Coast) (No. 8) (Scotland) Order 2002 (S.S.I. 2002/333)
 Welfare of Farmed Animals (Scotland) Amendment Regulations 2002 (S.S.I. 2002/334)
 Late Payment of Commercial Debts (Scotland) Regulations 2002 (S.S.I. 2002/335)
 Late Payment of Commercial Debts (Rate of Interest) (Scotland) Order 2002 (S.S.I. 2002/336)
 Late Payment of Commercial Debts (Interest) Act 1998 (Commencement No. 6) (Scotland) Order 2002 (S.S.I. 2002/337)
 Act of Sederunt (Lands Valuation Appeal Court) 2002 (S.S.I. 2002/340)
 Food Protection (Emergency Prohibitions) (Amnesic Shellfish Poisoning) (Orkney) (Scotland) Order 2002 (S.S.I. 2002/345)
 Contaminants in Food (Scotland) Amendment Regulations 2002 (S.S.I. 2002/349)
 Food Protection (Emergency Prohibitions) (Amnesic Shellfish Poisoning) (West Coast) (No. 9) (Scotland) Order 2002 (S.S.I. 2002/350)
 Food Protection (Emergency Prohibitions) (Amnesic Shellfish Poisoning) (Orkney) (No. 2) (Scotland) Order 2002 (S.S.I. 2002/353)
 Scottish Qualifications Authority Act 2002 (Commencement No. 1) Order 2002 (S.S.I. 2002/355)
 Food and Animal Feedingstuffs (Products of Animal Origin from China) (Emergency Control) (Scotland) Amendment Regulations 2002 (S.S.I. 2002/356)
 Food Protection (Emergency Prohibitions) (Amnesic Shellfish Poisoning) (West Coast) (No. 10) (Scotland) Order 2002 (S.S.I. 2002/357)
 Education (Disability Strategies and Pupils' Educational Records) (Scotland) Act 2002 (Commencement) Order 2002 (S.S.I. 2002/367)
 Disease Control (Interim Measures) (Scotland) Amendment Order 2002 (S.S.I. 2002/369)
 A9 Trunk Road (Ballinluig) (Temporary 50 mph Speed Limit) (Continuation) Order 2002 (S.S.I. 2002/371)
 Sports Grounds and Sporting Events (Designation) (Scotland) Amendment Order 2002 (S.S.I. 2002/82)
 Food Protection (Emergency Prohibitions) (Amnesic Shellfish Poisoning) (West Coast) (No. 5) (Scotland) Partial Revocation Order 2002 (S.S.I. 2002/383)
 Food Protection (Emergency Prohibitions) (Amnesic Shellfish Poisoning) (West Coast) (No. 8) (Scotland) Revocation Order 2002 (S.S.I. 2002/384)
 Act of Adjournal (Criminal Appeals) 2002 (S.S.I. 2002/387)
 Food Protection (Emergency Prohibitions) (Amnesic Shellfish Poisoning) (West Coast) (No. 11) (Scotland) Order 2002 (S.S.I. 2002/388)
 Registration of Births, Deaths and Marriages (Fees) (Scotland) Order 2002 (S.S.I. 2002/389)
 Births, Deaths, Marriages and Divorces (Fees) (Scotland) Amendment Regulations 2002 (S.S.I. 2002/390)
 Education (Disability Strategies) (Scotland) Regulations 2002 (S.S.I. 2002/391)
 Food for Particular Nutritional Uses (Addition of Substances for Specific Nutritional Purposes) (Scotland) Regulations 2002 (S.S.I. 2002/397)
 Road Traffic (Permitted Parking Area and Special Parking Area) (Perth and Kinross Council) Designation Order 2002 (S.S.I. 2002/398)
 Parking Attendants (Wearing of Uniforms) (Perth and Kinross Council Parking Area) Regulations 2002 (S.S.I. 2002/399)
 Road Traffic (Parking Adjudicators) (Perth and Kinross Council) Regulations 2002 (S.S.I. 2002/400)

401-500

 Food Protection (Emergency Prohibitions) (Amnesic Shellfish Poisoning) (West Coast) (No. 9) (Scotland) Revocation Order 2002 (S.S.I. 2002/401)
 Food Protection (Emergency Prohibitions) (Amnesic Shellfish Poisoning) (Orkney) (Scotland) Revocation Order 2002 (S.S.I. 2002/402)
 Food Protection (Emergency Prohibitions) (Amnesic Shellfish Poisoning) (Orkney) (No. 2) (Scotland) Revocation Order 2002 (S.S.I. 2002/403)
 Conservation of Seals (Scotland) Order 2002 (S.S.I. 2002/404)
 Education (Listed Bodies) (Scotland) Order 2002 (S.S.I. 2002/406)
 Electricity Act 1989 (Requirement of Consent for Offshore Generating Stations) (Scotland) Order 2002 (S.S.I. 2002/407)
 Food Protection (Emergency Prohibitions) (Amnesic Shellfish Poisoning) (Orkney) (No. 3) (Scotland) Order 2002 (S.S.I. 2002/408)
 Food Protection (Emergency Prohibitions) (Amnesic Shellfish Poisoning) (West Coast) (No. 5) (Scotland) Partial Revocation (No. 2) Order 2002 (S.S.I. 2002/409)
 Comhairle nan Eilean Siar (Various Harbours) Harbour Revision Order 2002 (S.S.I. 2002/410)
 Housing (Scotland) Act 2001 (Registered Social Landlords) Order 2002 (S.S.I. 2002/411)
 Homeless Persons Interim Accommodation (Scotland) Regulations 2002 (S.S.I. 2002/412)
 Housing (Scotland) Act 2001 (Appointment of Arbiter) Order 2002 (S.S.I. 2002/413)
 Homeless Persons Advice and Assistance (Scotland) Regulations 2002 (S.S.I. 2002/414)
 Housing (Scotland) Act 2001 (Scottish Secure Tenancy etc.) Amendment Order 2002 (S.S.I. 2002/415)
 Housing (Scotland) Act 2001 (Registration of Tenant Organisations) Order 2002 (S.S.I. 2002/416)
 Conservation of Salmon (Prohibition of Sale) (Scotland) Regulations 2002 (S.S.I. 2002/418)
 Road Humps and Traffic Calming (Scotland) Amendment Regulations 2002 (S.S.I. 2002/419)
 Police Reform Act 2002 (Commencement No. 2) (Scotland) Order 2002 (S.S.I. 2002/420)
 Food Protection (Emergency Prohibitions) (Amnesic Shellfish Poisoning) (West Coast) (No. 10) (Scotland) Partial Revocation Order 2002 (S.S.I. 2002/421)
 Food Protection (Emergency Prohibitions) (Amnesic Shellfish Poisoning) (West Coast) (No. 7) (Scotland) Order 2002 Revocation Order 2002 (S.S.I. 2002/422)
 Nursing and Midwifery Student Allowances (Scotland) Amendment Regulations 2002 (S.S.I. 2002/423)
 Food (Figs, Hazelnuts and Pistachios from Turkey) (Emergency Control) (Scotland) (No. 2) Regulations 2002 (S.S.I. 2002/424)
 Food (Peanuts from China) (Emergency Control) (Scotland) (No. 2) Regulations 2002 (S.S.I. 2002/425)
 Food Protection (Emergency Prohibitions) (Amnesic Shellfish Poisoning) (West Coast) (No. 12) (Scotland) Order 2002 (S.S.I. 2002/430)
 Food Protection (Emergency Prohibitions) (Amnesic Shellfish Poisoning) (West Coast) (No. 5) (Scotland) Revocation Order 2002 (S.S.I. 2002/431)
 Land Registration (Scotland) Act 1979 (Commencement No. 16) Order 2002 (S.S.I. 2002/432)
 Housing (Scotland) Act 2001 (Commencement No. 6 and Amendment) Order 2002 (S.S.I. 2002/433)
 Scottish Secure Tenancies (Exceptions) Amendment Regulations 2002 (S.S.I. 2002/434)
 Freedom of Information (Scotland) Act 2002 (Commencement No. 1) Order 2002 (S.S.I. 2002/437)
 National Health Service (General Medical Services) (Scotland) Amendment Regulations 2002 (S.S.I. 2002/438)
 Criminal Legal Aid (Scotland) (Fees) Amendment (No. 2) Regulations 2002 (S.S.I. 2002/440)
 Criminal Legal Aid (Scotland) Amendment Regulations 2002 (S.S.I. 2002/441)
 Criminal Legal Aid (Fixed Payments) (Scotland) Amendment (No. 2) Regulations 2002 (S.S.I. 2002/442)
 Sexual Offences (Procedure and Evidence) (Scotland) Act 2002 (Commencement and Transitional Provisions) Order 2002 (S.S.I. 2002/443)
 Housing (Scotland) Act 2001 (Housing Support Services) Regulations 2002 (S.S.I. 2002/444)
 Products of Animal Origin (Third Country Imports) (Scotland) Regulations 2002 (S.S.I. 2002/445)
 Bovines and Bovine Products (Trade) Amendment (Scotland) Regulations 2002 (S.S.I. 2002/449)
 Local Authorities' Traffic Orders (Exemptions for Disabled Persons) (Scotland) Regulations 2002 (S.S.I. 2002/450)
 Disabled Persons (Badges for Motor Vehicles) (Scotland) Amendment Regulations 2002 (S.S.I. 2002/451)
 Act of Adjournal (Criminal Procedure Rules Amendment No. 3) (Sexual Offences (Procedure and Evidence) (Scotland) Act 2002) 2002 (S.S.I. 2002/454)
 Scottish Local Government Elections Rules 2002 (S.S.I. 2002/457)
 Combined Police Area Amalgamation Schemes 1995 Amendment (No. 2) (Scotland) Order 2002 (S.S.I. 2002/458)
 Food Protection (Emergency Prohibitions) (Amnesic Shellfish Poisoning) (West Coast) (No. 13) (Scotland) Order 2002 (S.S.I. 2002/465)
 Scottish Public Services Ombudsman Act 2002 (Commencement and Revocation of Transitory and Transitional Provisions) Order 2002 (S.S.I. 2002/467)
 Scottish Public Services Ombudsman Act 2002 (Amendment) Order 2002 (S.S.I. 2002/468)
 Scottish Public Services Ombudsman Act 2002 (Transitory and Transitional Provisions) Order 2002 (S.S.I. 2002/469)
 Discontinuance of Legalised Police Cells (Ayr) Rules 2002 (S.S.I. 2002/472)
 Water Customer Consultation Panels (Scotland) Order 2002 (S.S.I. 2002/473)
 Food Protection (Emergency Prohibitions) (Amnesic Shellfish Poisoning) (West Coast) (No. 14) (Scotland) Order 2002 (S.S.I. 2002/482)
 Plant Health (Phytophthora ramorum) (Scotland) (No. 2) Order 2002 (S.S.I. 2002/483)
 Pollution Prevention and Control (Designation of Council Directives on Large Combustion Plants and National Emission Ceilings) (Scotland) Order 2002 (S.S.I. 2002/488)
 Pesticides (Maximum Residue Levels in Crops, Food and Feeding Stuffs) (Scotland) Amendment (No. 2) Regulations 2002 (S.S.I. 2002/489)
 Large Combustion Plants (Scotland) Regulations 2002 (S.S.I. 2002/493)
 Civil Legal Aid (Scotland) Regulations 2002 (S.S.I. 2002/494)
 Advice and Assistance (Scotland) Amendment Regulations 2002 (S.S.I. 2002/495)
 Civil Legal Aid (Scotland) (Fees) Amendment Regulations 2002 (S.S.I. 2002/496)
 Plastic Materials and Articles in Contact with Food (Amendment) (Scotland) Regulations 2002 (S.S.I. 2002/498)
 Taxi Drivers' Licences (Carrying of Guide Dogs and Hearing Dogs) (Scotland) Regulations 2002 (S.S.I. 2002/500)

501-570

 Peterhead Harbours Revision (Constitution) Order 2002 (S.S.I. 2002/504)
 Food Protection (Emergency Prohibitions) (Amnesic Shellfish Poisoning) (West Coast) (No. 10) (Scotland) Revocation Order 2002 (S.S.I. 2002/510)
 Food Protection (Emergency Prohibitions) (Amnesic Shellfish Poisoning) (West Coast) (No. 15) (Scotland) Order 2002 (S.S.I. 2002/511)
 Tobacco Advertising and Promotion Act 2002 (Commencement) (Scotland) Order 2002 (S.S.I. 2002/512)
 Act of Sederunt (Fees of Messengers-At-Arms) 2002 (S.S.I. 2002/513)
 Act of Sederunt (Rules of the Court of Session Amendment No. 2) (Applications under the Protection from Abuse (Scotland) Act 2001) 2002 (S.S.I. 2002/514)
 Act of Sederunt (Fees of Sheriff Officers) 2002 (S.S.I. 2002/515)
 Act of Sederunt (Summary Cause Rules) (Amendment) 2002 (S.S.I. 2002/516)
 Act of Adjournal (Criminal Procedure Rules Amendment No 4) (Extradition) 2002 (S.S.I. 2002/517)
 Potatoes Originating in Egypt (Scotland) Amendment Regulations 2002 (S.S.I. 2002/518)
 Fur farming (Prohibition) (Scotland) Act 2002 (Commencement) Order 2002 (S.S.I. 2002/519)
 Seeds (Miscellaneous Amendments) (Scotland) Regulations 2002 (S.S.I. 2002/520)
 Taxi Drivers' Licences (Carrying of Guide Dogs and Hearing Dogs) (Scotland) Amendment Regulations 2002 (S.S.I. 2002/521)
 Scottish Local Government Elections Amendment Rules 2002 (S.S.I. 2002/522)
 Kava-kava in Food (Scotland) Regulations 2002 (S.S.I. 2002/523)
 Food Labelling Amendment (Scotland) Regulations 2002 (S.S.I. 2002/524)
 Seeds (Fees) (Scotland) Regulations 2002 (S.S.I. 2002/526)
 Smoke Control Areas (Authorised Fuels) (Scotland) Amendment Regulations 2002 (S.S.I. 2002/527)
 Road Traffic (NHS Charges) Amendment (No. 2) (Scotland) Regulations 2002 (S.S.I. 2002/528)
 Poultry Breeding Flocks, Hatcheries and Animal By Products (Fees) (Scotland) Order 2002 (S.S.I. 2002/529)
 Disease Control (Interim Measures) (Scotland) Amendment (No. 2) Order 2002 (S.S.I. 2002/530)
 Sheep and Goats Identification (Scotland) Amendment (No. 2) Regulations 2002 (S.S.I. 2002/531)
 Legal Aid (Scotland) Act 1986 Amendment Regulations 2002 (S.S.I. 2002/532)
 Community Care (Joint Working etc.) (Scotland) Regulations 2002 (S.S.I. 2002/533)
 NHS Quality Improvement Scotland Order 2002 (S.S.I. 2002/534)
 NHS Quality Improvement Scotland (Transfer of Officers) Regulations 2002 (S.S.I. 2002/535)
 Plant Protection Products Amendment (No. 3) (Scotland) Regulations 2002 (S.S.I. 2002/537)
 Removal and Disposal of Vehicles Amendment (Scotland) Regulations 2002 (S.S.I. 2002/538)
 Pigs (Records, Identification and Movement) (Scotland) Amendment Order 2002 (S.S.I. 2002/540)
 Genetically Modified Organisms (Deliberate Release) (Scotland) Regulations 2002 (S.S.I. 2002/541)
 Budget (Scotland) Act 2002 Amendment Order 2002 (S.S.I. 2002/542)
 Food Protection (Emergency Prohibitions) (Amnesic Shellfish Poisoning) (West Coast) (No. 16) (Scotland) Order 2002 (S.S.I. 2002/544)
 Food Protection (Emergency Prohibitions) (Amnesic Shellfish Poisoning) (West Coast) (No. 11) (Scotland) Partial Revocation Order 2002 (S.S.I. 2002/545)
 Designation of Nitrate Vulnerable Zones (Scotland) (No. 2) Regulations 2002 (S.S.I. 2002/546)
 Local Authorities' Traffic Orders (Exemptions for Disabled Persons) (Scotland) Amendment Regulations 2002 (S.S.I. 2002/547)
 Public Service Vehicles (Registration of Local Services) (Scotland) Amendment Regulations 2002 (S.S.I. 2002/548)
 School Crossing Patrol Sign (Scotland) Regulations 2002 (S.S.I. 2002/549)
 Food Protection (Emergency Prohibitions) (Amnesic Shellfish Poisoning) (West Coast) (No. 4) (Scotland) Order 2002 Revocation Order 2002 (S.S.I. 2002/550)
 Food Protection (Emergency Prohibitions) (Amnesic Shellfish Poisoning) (West Coast) (No. 6) (Scotland) Partial Revocation Order 2002 (S.S.I. 2002/551)
 Food Protection (Emergency Prohibitions) (Amnesic Shellfish Poisoning) (West Coast) (No. 12) (Scotland) Partial Revocation Order 2002 (S.S.I. 2002/552)
 Food Protection (Emergency Prohibitions) (Amnesic Shellfish Poisoning) (West Coast) (No. 14) (Scotland) Partial Revocation Order 2002 (S.S.I. 2002/553)
 Air Quality Limit Values (Scotland) Amendment Regulations 2002 (S.S.I. 2002/556)
 Inverness Harbour Revision (Constitution) Order 2002 (S.S.I. 2002/557)
 Food Protection (Emergency Prohibitions) (Amnesic Shellfish Poisoning) (Orkney) (No. 3) (Scotland) Partial Revocation Order 2002 (S.S.I. 2002/558)
 Act of Sederunt (Debt Arrangement and Attachment (Scotland) Act 2002) 2002 (S.S.I. 2002/560)
 Scottish Local Government Elections Regulations 2002 (S.S.I. 2002/561)
 Adoption (Intercountry Aspects) Act 1999 (Commencement No. 7) (Scotland) Order 2002 (S.S.I. 2002/562)
 Act of Sederunt (Summary Applications, Statutory Applications and Appeals etc. Rules) Amendment (No. 5) (Proceeds of Crime Act 2002) 2002 (S.S.I. 2002/563)
 Seeds (Miscellaneous Amendments) (No. 2) (Scotland) Regulations 2002 (S.S.I. 2002/564)
 Products of Animal Origin (Third Country Imports) (Scotland) Amendment Regulations 2002 (S.S.I. 2002/565)
 Act of Sederunt (Fees of Messengers-at-Arms) (No. 2) 2002 (S.S.I. 2002/566)
 Act of Sederunt (Fees of Sheriff Officers) (No. 2) 2002 (S.S.I. 2002/567)
 Act of Sederunt (Fees of Solicitors in the Sheriff Court) (Amendment No. 4) 2002 (S.S.I. 2002/568)
 Proceeds of Crime Act 2002 (Cash Searches: Constables in Scotland: Code of Practice) Order 2002 (S.S.I. 2002/569)
 Act of Sederunt (Rules of the Court of Session Amendment No. 2) (Personal Injuries Actions) 2002 (S.S.I. 2002/570)

External links
 Scottish Statutory Instrument List
 Scottish  Draft Statutory Instrument List

2002
Statutory Instruments
Scotland Statutory Instruments